Balanci is a village in the municipality of Centar Župa, North Macedonia. The nearby village of Vlasiḱi was once a neighbourhood of Balanci. Other neighbouring villages of Bajramovci, Crno Boci and Odžovci were also once neighbourhoods of Balanci until the mid 1960s when they were elevated to the status of separate villages. It is the only village in the municipality with an Albanian majority.

Name 
The toponym Balanci is a patronymic formation derived from the name Balan and the suffix (ov)ci.

Demographics
As of the 2021 census, Balanci had 165 residents with the following ethnic composition:
Albanians 149
Persons for whom data are taken from administrative sources 12
Turks 4

According to the 2002 census, the village had a total of 432 inhabitants. Ethnic groups in the village include:
Albanians 422
Macedonians 9
Others 1

Some Macedonian Muslims live in the village alongside the Albanian population of Balanci.

References

Villages in Centar Župa Municipality
Albanian communities in North Macedonia